Kallstroemia parviflora, also called small-flowered carpetweed or warty caltrop, is found in the United States, and extends as far south as Central America. From east to west, it can be found from Illinois to Arizona. It is an orange or yellow small-flowered annual, with zygomorphic flowers consistent with the Zygophyllaceae, or creosote-bush family, to which it belongs. Leaves are compound and are 3–6 cm, with 4 pairs leaflets. The stem is pubescent and 30–60 cm. Flowers measure at 1 cm, while the ovoid fruit measures at 4 mm. The plant prefers dry soils and can be found in locations such as near roads and railroads.

References

parviflora
Flora of the United States
Flora of the Southwestern United States
Flora of Northeastern Mexico
Flora of Northwestern Mexico
Flora of Southwestern Mexico
Flora of the California desert regions
Natural history of the Mojave Desert
Flora without expected TNC conservation status